Robert Briton Selby (born March 27, 1945) is a Canadian former professional ice hockey left winger who played in the National Hockey League (NHL) for the Toronto Maple Leafs, Philadelphia Flyers and St. Louis Blues from 1965 to 1971. He also played in the World Hockey Association (WHA) for the Quebec Nordiques, New England Whalers and Toronto Toros from 1972 to 1975.

Playing career
Selby started his hockey career with the Toronto Marlboros in the OHA where he played five seasons. Selby got his first taste of a championship win in 1963–64, when the Marlboros swept the Edmonton Oil Kings in 4 games to win their fourth Memorial Cup. In 1964–65, Selby was called up by the Toronto Maple Leafs to replace injured forward Ron Ellis in the NHL. He played 3 games with the Leafs, scoring 2 goals. Selby scored his first NHL goal against the New York Rangers' Jacques Plante in his first NHL game. Ellis would return and the Leafs sent Selby back down to the juniors.

The following season, Selby had a full-time roster spot with the Leafs. Selby scored a total of 27 points in his rookie season and was awarded the Calder Memorial Trophy, for best rookie of the season. His total of 27 points is the lowest scoring total by a Calder-winning forward since 1937–38. Struggling early on the next season, the Leafs sent Selby down to the minors to play with the Vancouver Canucks in the WHL. He played 15 games before injuring his leg, sidelining him out for the remainder of the year. In 1967, the NHL expanded by introducing 6 new teams. Selby was claimed by the Philadelphia Flyers in the Expansion Draft. During his first year with the Flyers, Selby set career highs in goals, assists, and points. The Flyers traded Selby back to his old team, the Maple Leafs, in 1968–69. Selby spent one season with the Leafs, before being traded again, this time to the St. Louis Blues. His stay with the Blues would be short however, as he was sent down to the minors with the Kansas City Blues.

In 1972–73, a newly formed league, the World Hockey Association was created. Selby was selected in the WHA General Player Draft by the Houston Aeros. Seeing an opportunity to jump out of the minors, Selby took it and signed on with the Aeros. Before even playing a game with the Aeros, he was immediately traded to the Quebec Nordiques. After playing only 7 games with the Nordiques, he was quickly traded to the Philadelphia Blazers, who in turn traded him to the New England Whalers. He spent 63 games with the Whalers, winning the Avco World Trophy, the WHA championship. In 1973–74, he was traded to the Toronto Toros, where he would retire.

Post-playing career
After his playing career, Selby was a history teacher at North Toronto Collegiate Institute from which he retired in 2010. He is now an occasional substitute teacher.

Awards and achievements
 Memorial Cup champion in 1964
 Calder Memorial Trophy winner in 1966
 Avco World Trophy champion in 1973

Career statistics

Regular season and playoffs

References

External links
 

1945 births
Living people
Calder Trophy winners
Canadian ice hockey left wingers
Canadian people of English descent
Ice hockey people from Ontario
Kansas City Blues players
New England Whalers players
Philadelphia Flyers players
Quebec Nordiques (WHA) players
St. Louis Blues players
Sportspeople from Kingston, Ontario
Toronto Maple Leafs players
Toronto Marlboros players
Toronto Toros players
Vancouver Canucks (WHL) players